Yang Berhormat Dato' Murshid Diraja Dr. Juanda Jaya is a Malaysian politician and mufti who has served as State Deputy Minister in the Premier's Department of Sarawak in charge of Integrity and Ombudsman in the Gabungan Parti Sarawak (GPS) state administration under Premier Abang Abdul Rahman Johari Abang Openg and Minister John Sikie Tayai since January 2022 and Member of the Sarawak State Legislative Assembly (MLA) for Jemoreng since May 2016. He is a member of the Parti Pesaka Bumiputera Bersatu (PBB), a component party of the ruling GPS coalition. He also served as the Mufti of Perlis from January 2009 to January 2014. 
On 1 October 2009, he started to take leave and was a visiting scholar to Oxford University from 6 October 2009 to 3 August 2010 for 10 months and he is of Melanau descent (and was the only East Malaysian so far to hold a Muftiate position in one of the Peninsular Malaysian states).

Political career
Rumors as opposition candidate in the 2013 general election

Perlis PKR Chairman Mohd Faisol Abdul Rahman claimed that Juanda would be the candidate of Parti Keadilan Rakyat (PKR) and Pakatan Rakyat (PR) in the Kangar federal seat in the 2013 general election. However, the claim was strongly refuted by him and he did not contest in the election.

2016 Sarawak state election

In the 2016 Sarawak state election, he was nominated as the BN candidate for the Jemoreng state seat, as the incumbent Jemoreng MLA and then Political Secretary to the Chief Minister of Sarawak, Abu Seman Jahwie wished not to be renominated due to health reason. He was later elected as the new MLA, beating independent candidate Abdullah Saminan and Pakatan Harapan (PH) as well as National Trust Party (AMANAH) candidate Kiprawi Suhaili with 3,789 votes.

2021 Sarawak state election and appointment to the Cabinet of Sarawak as State Deputy Minister

In the 2021 Sarawak state election, he was renominated as GPS candidate to defend and successfully retained his Jemoreng seat, defeating independent candidate Osman Rafaee and PH as well as AMANAH candidate Zainab Suhaili with increased majority of 5,012. On 30 December 2021, Premier of Sarawak Abang Abdul Rahman Johari Abang Openg unveiled his new cabinet lineup, Juanda was then appointed as State Deputy Minister in the Premier's Department in charge of Integrity and Ombudsman on 4 January 2022.

Election results

References

Date of birth missing (living people)
Living people
Malaysian academics
Melanau people
People's Justice Party (Malaysia) politicians
Parti Pesaka Bumiputera Bersatu politicians
Members of the Sarawak State Legislative Assembly
Year of birth missing (living people)
Muftis in Malaysia